Malahorna (in older sources: Maloharna) is a village in the Municipality of Oplotnica in eastern Slovenia. The area is part of the traditional region of Styria. The municipality is now included in the Drava Statistical Region.

The local church, built on a low hill south of the settlement, is dedicated to Saint Barbara and belongs to the parish of Čadram–Oplotnica. It dates to the mid-15th century with 17th-century additions.

References

External links
Malahorna on Geopedia

Populated places in the Municipality of Oplotnica